Dagfinn the Yeoman (c. 1175 - C. 1233), or Dagfinn Bondir, was a warrior, liegeman, Law man of Gulating, and Marshal of Haakon IV of Norway. His background is uncertain but it can be assumed that he was the son of a Yeoman based on his name. He fought for king Sverre of Norway at the Battle of floravoe (1194), and the Battle of Johnsfields. In 1217 he was sent to Trondheim by the king to announce that King Haakon was the new King of Norway. According to his letters

"But if ye men of Drontheim will in any way put forward those men

who are your kinsmen or foster-brothers, though

they may have some kinship or trace their pedigree

to the kings, and so should each of them follow

their kinsmen or foster-brothers, then it may be

that there will be soon very many ness-kings (petty kings)."

It is unclear to what degree the letter indulges in flattery of the peoples bloodline or if it simply wished to deter rival claimant's. After reading the letter Dagfinn made a speech to gather support for Haakon. He often served as a messenger and when the messengers delivering a letter from Skule Bardsson to a magnate found out that he had used the king's seal, they told Dagfinn for him to pass onto the king. Later he was sent to seek the support of the Archbishop of Nidaros along with Gregorious Jonson. After having been rejected from a meeting with the archbishop due to doubts about Haakon's birth Dagfinn advised Haakon to hold a meeting with all the loyal magnates of the land in Bergen in 1218 to establish his legitimacy. Dagfinn had a leading role in the meeting and spoke in Haakon's defense acting as his chief councilor.

Earl Skule Bardsson and the Archbishop of Nidaros challenge Haakon to a trial by ordeal which involves hot irons to which Haakon accepts to prove his legitimacy. On the night before the trial when a Smith named Sigar of Brabant in Earl Skule Bardsson's Retinue offers Dagfinn a special herb that is supposed to help the burn Dagfinn turns him down claiming Haakon will not need it because he is not lying, showing himself to be both clever, and honest. The trial ended in success for Haakon and later Dagfinn was involved in a naval skirmish with Skule Bårdsson and his men. During the fight Dagfinn tells the earl on behalf of the king that its better for him if he agrees to peace because they will not runaway or give up. In combination with Haakon's offer of Atonement (Probably financial compensation) for the death of one of the earls kinsmen, Gunnolf, Skule agrees for a truce in the night.

Later in 1219 AD. Dagfinn is sent to Tønsberg to make ready for the king to spend Yule at, the Earl sends his own man, Grundi the Treasurer. In 1219 Dagfinn is one of the five councilors who writes to Arnbjorn Jonsson, his son, and Paul Barrowpole asking for support against Skule Bårdsson who is the regent. Later he was one of the two lawmen of the Gulating and in  his capacity as lawman he proclaimed that Haakon was the only legitimate king of Norway. Dagfinn generally tried to inspire peace between Skule Bardsson and Haakon. Haakon was supposed to be married to Skule Bardsson's daughter but he was delayed due to strife in the bay and sent Dagfinn as a messenger to the Earl to inform him. In 1225 he sailed to Haakon and asked to join him on his march to Värmland but the king instructed him to stay behind and ensure his son Sigurd would inherit the throne if he didn't return from Varmland.

While returning to Bergen from Oslo he was iced in and had to stay with the Southmen to avoid the Ribbalds. In 1233 AD. he was still making speeches for the king and was by his side but he probably died soon after because he must have been at least 58 by that time.

References

13th-century Norwegian nobility
Yeomen